is a Japanese manga written and illustrated by Toshihiko Kobayashi. It was first serialized in Kodansha's shōnen manga magazine Weekly Shōnen Magazine from July 2002 to July 2003, then moved to Magazine Special in September 2003 and finished in January 2017. Its chapters were collected in 44 tankōbon volumes. It was published in North America by Del Rey Manga; only the first 14 volumes were released.

Plot
16-year-old Mugi Tadano tries to shake off his latest heartbreak by working at his friend's aunt's beach-side inn. One day he spies on a beautiful girl, Yuu Tsukisaki, changing clothes in an alley behind the inn. Instead of getting angry, Yuu charges him the price of a soda for watching her. The next day Mugi is set up on a blind date with Yuu, and they have a great time — until Mugi walks in in the middle of her bath. Yuu decides to leave on the next ferry out, leaving Mugi heartbroken again. However, when he returns home, he is surprised to find that Yuu and her younger sister Tsukasa are going to be his housemates, as their parents were mutual friends.

The series follows Mugi's adventures with his new roommates. In the first few days, Tsukasa leaves the two of them alone. Mugi's classmate and childhood friend Manami shows interest in Mugi but later supports their relationship. Yuu attracts several boys and even visits her home town over in Tokyo, making Mugi so jealous that he follows her, and ends up meeting his ex. Other girls visit their household, including Mugi's big sister-like childhood friend Sayuri who has become a model, and classmate Kiku Murakami, who tries unsuccessfully to smear Yuu's reputation.

Mugi discovers he has a talent for cooking, and meets Tetsu Shiba, an owner of a small restaurant, and Aoi Sonobe, a young woman who likes Tetsu. Yuu and Tsukasa's mother visits and wants to take her back. Tsukasa senses that Mugi likes Yuu, so she tries to set him up as much as she can. Sayuri gets engaged. Kazumi tells Mugi that he likes Manami and wants to date her. A busty young woman, Mako Minamino, joins the household as Mugi's father's love interest. After numerous missed opportunities, Mugi finally confesses to Yuu that he likes her and they become a couple.

Later stories involve more girls and relationships, including schoolmate Urara Haruno who has a reputation for dressing sexy, her sister Moe who enjoys reading romance novels, Tooko who is a Japanese idol in love with Mugi, and Tsukasa's friend Pepper from America who joins the household. While Mugi and Yuu still try to figure out how to advance their relationship they see their friends hooking up: Sayuri gets married, Tetsu and Aoi agree to sign a marriage certificate, and even Mako and Mugi's father sign one.

Characters
In the bonus comic "The Pastel Meeting", Kobayashi sketched a meeting with his editor where they ended up talking about the appeal of Japanese actresses/models Aoi Miyazaki, Yū Aoi, and Leah Dizon, who became the inspirations for the stories in Pastel.

Main characters

Mugi is a high school boy who has lived by himself most of his life because of his mother’s death and his father’s being away for work. His friends describe him as plain, yet responsible and dependable. He falls in love with Yuu at first sight, and has sexual fantasies about her after she begins living with him. In order to not compromise their living situation, he suppresses his thoughts, and holds back from expressing his feelings for her, preferring to just protect her. Despite often stumbling into compromising situations with girls, and having to go along with their demands for his time and attention, he refuses their confessions because he likes Yuu the most. After being encouraged multiple times by his friends, he finally confesses to Yuu and has his feelings reciprocated.

The cover girl of the series and Mugi's love interest, Yuu accepts Mugi's father's offer to live with Mugi after her father dies. She is good-natured, smart and responsible (lacking only some cooking skills and handiwork), described as being very cute with a developed body. She is popular in school and has an easy time making friends. Even though she returns to live with her mother, she later returns to Mugi's place the next summer to finish high school. Although at times she has denied having romantic interest in Mugi, she gets jealous when he receives affections from girls that are not his childhood friends.  As of the end of volume 14, she stops denying her own feelings, and responds to Mugi's confession. Some of the later chapters are presented from her perspective.

Supporting characters

Yuu’s younger sister, Tsukasa is a vibrant, mayhem-causing character who loves attention. She is more knowledgeable about relationships than her older sister, and often embarrasses Mugi by guessing his perverted thoughts, although she herself does not engage in such activity. She sometimes hatches elaborate plans for Yuu and Mugi to be together. She initially lives with Yuu and Mugi, but later moves to live with her mother, and lives in America. When she returns to Japan, her body has matured so that she can impersonate her sister by donning a wig.  She also likes to hide in the walls to spy on Mugi and Yuu.

Mugi’s best friend since childhood. In the first chapter, Mugi remarks that he looks about 20 years old. Most girls that he flirts with flatly reject him; those who do not usually slap him because he is too forward. On his 18th birthday, he confesses to Manami, having liked her for over a decade but keeping silent beforehand because she liked Mugi. After they begin dating, he cleans up his act a little in order to feel that he is deserving of her.

She is one of Mugi’s childhood friends. She harbors a crush on Mugi, but holds back her confession because he was dating her friend Hinako. She later confesses to Mugi, but is turned down as he has fallen in love with Yuu. She is later shocked when Kazuki confesses she has liked her for ten years, but later realizes they care about each other, and agrees to date him.

 Mugi’s next-door neighbor who acts like his big sister. After Mugi's mother died, Sayuri watched over him and even taught him how to cook. She is a Tokyo University student and a model. She occasionally visits Mugi where she binges on beer and plays Tekken with Tsukasa. She so values her relationship with Mugi that she introduces her fiance Takumi to him before she does to her parents. She and Takumi marry.

 Kiku is a popular schoolmate that the main characters meet on a group date. She likes to tease guys and use them for her own entertainment, but is piqued when Mugi resists her advances. After seeing how popular and innocent Yuu is, she pretends to be her friend, but secretly tries to sully her reputation by taking scandalous pictures of herself dressed up like Yuu, and spreading them to their schoolmates. She returns in a later storyline at the beach-side inn. Although she no longer puts up an innocent act, she is still popular with guys and is quite flirtatious, but refuses to get into any relationships with them. She still likes Mugi, believing that his relationship with Yuu will not last, and ponders when they might break up. She later becomes friends with Urara, who has an opposite personality to her.

 Mugi’s father is a photographer who is often away from home for long periods of time so that Mugi is never sure when he visits. He makes a promise with Yuu and Tsukasa's father that he would take care of his daughters. He briefly returns to check up on Mugi, Yuu and Mako; the latter tells him that she has fallen in love again, reminding him of a promise he had made to her when they first met that when she ever does, he would give her a reward. When she hints that it is him, he simply smiles and signs his half of the marriage certificate.

Tetsu is the owner of a small restaurant; he offers Mugi and Yuu refuge when they get caught in the rain. After tasting Mugi’s cooking, he offers him a part-time job and becomes his cooking mentor. He has an Imari plate collection that dwindles whenever Aoi visits and gets angry. Although Aoi likes him a lot, Tetsu tries not to return her affections because he wants her to be free. He and Aoi often argue., but eventually Tetsu accepts Aoi's feelings, and the two become a couple. When Tetsu was younger, he and Ken were rivals for Mugi's mother's affection. It is revealed that he and Aoi had filled out a marriage registration form, which they turn in to the courthouse later.

 Aoi is a young traveling artist who frequents Tetsu’s restaurant. Although she likes to hug and kiss people, she has feelings for Tetsu, and gets jealous whenever he brushes her off or mentions liking older women. In the end, when Aoi finally gets tired of Tetsu after hearing from him that he was getting an omiai, she resolves to leave. Before she does, Tetsu catches up to her and asks her to come back to him, promising her that he would give her happiness. She and Tetsu fill out a marriage registration form, but she does not submit it until the end of the chapter when she thinks she is pregnant.

Mako is a busty woman who joins the Tadano household as Mugi's new mother. Ken met her in Alaska when he was taking pictures during the Aurora Borealis, where she was mourning the third anniversary of her high school sweetheart’s death. Being only five years older than Mugi, she enjoys suggesting activities with Mugi that Yuu deems inappropriate, and plays games that have a sexual twist, such as strip rock-paper-scissors, with uncanny good luck. She reveals that she and Ken have not married or planned a wedding yet, but later on reveals that she does love Ken. She becomes Mugi and Yuu's homeroom teacher, and Mugi's official stepmother after Ken signs his half of the marriage certificate.

 Urara is introduced as a schoolmate in Mugi's after-school supplementary class. She has a reputation of being ero kawaii (a combination of being erotic but cute) because of her sexy dress and appearance, although she is unaware of her effects on others. Yuu is initially jealous of her when she sees her hanging around with Mugi, but she learns that Urara has a crush on a childhood friend who plays basketball and looks up to Yuu as a role model.
 
 Urara's younger sister who wears glasses. She is described as shy and a bookworm, but well-endowed like her sister. She aspires to be a novelist and solicits Mugi's help to write a story on what it's like to live with Yuu, whom she idolizes. She is a bit airheaded and clumsy, often falling to the floor in a sexy position and losing her glasses. She is an otaku, and prefers falling in love with the guy character in the novels she reads, and has a fear of guys besides Mugi (who she thinks of more like a female friend) and his father (upon whom she gets a brief crush).
 
 Tsukasa's schoolmate and buddy from America, Pepper is a blonde-haired girl who joins Tsukasa when she returns to Japan. She flirts with Mugi quite a bit when they initially meet. She has a black belt in karate, and also does other martial arts such as judo and aikido. She was born in Japan and adopted after birth. Her biological father proposed to her mother in Onomichi, and she was named after the seasoning when they ate at Tetsu's restaurant. Ken agrees to adopt her into the Tadano family. 
 
 Named after the Mandarin orange box she was found in, Mikan is a kitten that joins the Tadano household. She stars in a side story in Pastel as well as some of its chapters where she muses about Mugi and Yuu's slowly developing relationship.
 
 Yuu's St. Bernard whom she got on her birthday when she was little. He was named after the snack.

Minor characters

 Manami’s best friend and Mugi's former girlfriend, having broken up with Mugi prior to the start of the series when she left for Tokyo for school. She is very accident prone, and compatible with Mugi and his supportive personality. During Mugi's trip to Tokyo, it is revealed that she still has feelings for him.  In a return visit, it is revealed that her relationship with Mugi had progressed so slowly, that Kazuki and Manami forged love letters to get them together, and they technically had not broken up. Although she has dated many guys, she still has feelings for Mugi and confesses to him one more time, but is turned down when Mugi replies that he likes Yuu. In the afterword of volume 14, Kobayashi noted that he brought back Hinako Kayama because of her popularity with readers, giving her a story that spanned five chapters.

She divorced her husband when her daughters were still in elementary school because she could not handle the long period of time in which he was away. When she remarried, she let Yuu and Tsukasa live with the Tadanos so as to not cause conflict with her new family. After taking Yuu and Tsukasa back, she reconciles with her second husband as her stepson has moved out of the house; she and Tsukasa relocate with her husband to the United States.
Yuu and Tsukasa's father
A former rival photographer and friend of Ken Tadano. Both were in members of the photography club in university. Because he was away for long periods of time from his family, he and his wife divorced when Yuu and Tsukasa were in elementary school. However, he later retires to take care of his daughters. His death at the start of the series places Yuu and Tsukasa under the care of the Tadanos.

A good-looking and popular schoolmate who asks Yuu out early in the series. Although Yuu agrees to go out with him, she only thinks of him as a friend. His father owns a restaurant that does French cuisine. He later helps Yuu make a cake. When Yuu refuses his confession, and he notices her with Mugi, he does not believe they are actually a couple. In a later chapter, he has a girlfriend.

A daughter of one of Tetsu’s friends who owns a restaurant. Mugi works for her for a week, after which Mugi discovers she is a year younger in his school. Yuu is jealous of her because Hana acts quite friendly with Mugi, walking with him to school and bringing him lunch.

He is introduced as Sayuri’s fiancé. He works at a small second-hand furniture shop. The first time he sees her, he proposes to her, but after dating, she eventually accepts. He likes to repair people's stuff even when not asked. Unlike Sayuri, he does not drink alcohol, and prefers tomato juice. Although he loses their wedding rings, he is able to reconcile with Sayuri and presents her with a wood-carved ring that matches his. He also presents a pair for Mugi and Yuu.
 
 Tooko is a young actress from the agency that Sayuri works with. She introduces herself as Mugi’s younger sister, and uses a wig to disguise herself. She takes breaks from her acting duties, and likes being affectionate with Mugi, declaring Yuu her rival, and occasionally bragging to Yuu about it with text messages.

Publication
Written and illustrated by Toshihiko Kobayashi, Pastel was serialized in Kodansha's shōnen manga magazine Weekly Shōnen Magazine from July 24, 2002, to July 16, 2003. The series was then transferred to Magazine Special, where it ran from September 20, 2003, to January 20, 2017. Kodansha collected its chapters in 44 tankōbon volumes, released from November 13, 2002, to February 17, 2017.

In North America, the manga was licensed by Del Rey Manga. 14 volumes were released from December 27, 2005, to September 29, 2009. before the company ceased its manga publishing business in 2010.

Volume list

Volumes 1–14

Volumes 15–42

Reception
In Manga: The Complete Guide, Jason Thompson gave the series  out of 4 stars. He wrote: "Pastel is less a story than a supplement to the swimsuit photos that often run in shonen manga magazines. The hero is passive and wimpy, and the girl is an inscrutable abstraction, occasionally sad or peeved, but mostly fawning over Mugi despite the fact that he's accidentally seen her naked umpteen times." He also writes that the "art is slick, with curvy bodies and detailed, photorealistic backgrounds."

Works cited
 "Ch." and "Vol." is shortened form for chapter and volume and refers to a chapter or volume number of the Pastel manga, written by Toshihiko Kobayashi. Original Japanese version published by Kodansha. English version by Del Rey Manga.

Notes

References

External links
 Pastel at Shōnen Magazine/Kodansha website
 

Del Rey Manga
Kodansha manga
Romantic comedy anime and manga
Shōnen manga